Llansillin (anglicisation of the original Welsh Llansilin) was a rural district in the administrative county of Denbighshire from 1894 to 1935. 

The rural district was formed from parts of Corwen, Llanfyllin and Oswestry Rural Sanitary Districts in Denbighshire. 

The district contained six civil parishes:
Llanarmon Dyffryn Ceiriog
Llanarmon Mynydd Mawr
Llangadwaladr
Llangedwyn
Llanrhaeadr ym Mochnant
Llansilin 

Llansillin Rural District was abolished by a County Review Order in 1935, becoming part of the new Ceiriog Rural District.

Sources
Denbighshire Administrative County (Vision of Britain)

History of Denbighshire
Rural districts of Wales